Rodrigo Cabral (born 8 August 2000) is an Argentine professional footballer who plays as a left winger for Argebtinos Juniors.

Career
Cabral joined the youth academy of Huracán in 2016, having previously appeared for local teams Paso de Los Andes and San Lorenzo Mercedes. His progression into the Primera División club's first-team squad arrived in September 2019, with the centre-forward appearing on the substitutes bench for a victory away to Defensa y Justicia. Cabral made his professional debut a week later on 29 September versus Atlético Tucumán, as he replaced Juan Garro in the second half of a goalless draw at the Estadio Tomás Adolfo Ducó.

Career statistics
.

References

External links

2000 births
Living people
People from Mercedes, Corrientes
Argentine footballers
Association football forwards
Argentine Primera División players
Club Atlético Huracán footballers
Sportspeople from Corrientes Province